Arcachon Basin or alternatively Arcachon Bay is a bay of the Atlantic Ocean on the southwest coast of France, situated in Pays de Buch between the Côte d'Argent and the Côte des Landes, in the region of Aquitaine. Some of its geological features are natural preservation areas.

The general shape of the Bassin d'Arcachon is that of an equilateral triangle pointing north, the southwest corner of which is open to the sea, between Cap Ferret and the town of Arcachon (more specifically, one of the suburbs of La Teste-de-Buch, Pyla-sur-Mer), through a  narrow channel (Les Passes). On the north shore is the town of Arès, then Andernos-les-Bains on the northeast. Just south of the entrance is the Dune of Pilat. Nearly in the middle of the bay is a very particular island: L'île aux Oiseaux (Isle of the Birds).

Development
In the past, similar areas became lakes (called in French lacs or étangs) and are nowadays filled with fresh water. On the French Atlantic coast, running north–south between the Gironde estuary to the Adour River mouth, are the Lac d'Hourtin-Carcans, the Lac de Lacanau, the Étang de Cazaux et de Sanguinet, the Étang de Biscarrosse et de Parentis, the Étang d'Aureilhan, the Étang de Léon, the Étang de Soustons, Étang Hardy, Étang Blanc and the Étang de Garros. Arcachon Bay is the last water area that remains open to the ocean.

The Bassin still has a link to the sea perhaps because of the Eyre River that runs from the Landes forest and has its mouth (Delta de l'Eyre) in its southeast corner. Otherwise the Bassin would have become blocked by the sandbanks built up by the tides.

References

Landforms of Gironde
Bays of Metropolitan France
Ramsar sites in Metropolitan France